Shackeil Henry (born 2 April 1994) is a Trinidad & Tobago footballer.

External links 
 

1994 births
Living people
Trinidad and Tobago footballers
TT Pro League players
Point Fortin Civic F.C. players
W Connection F.C. players
Song Lam Nghe An FC players
Nam Định F.C. players
V.League 1 players
Expatriate footballers in Vietnam
Association football forwards
Footballers at the 2015 Pan American Games